Alexander Wilhelm von Brill (20 September 1842 – 18 June 1935) was a German mathematician.

Born in Darmstadt, Hesse, Brill was educated at the University of Giessen, where he earned his doctorate under supervision of Alfred Clebsch. He held a chair at the University of Tübingen, where Max Planck was among his students.
In 1933, he joined the National Socialist Teachers League as one of the first members from Tübingen.

The London Science Museum contains sliceform objects prepared by Brill and Felix Klein.

Selected publications
Vorlesungen über ebene algebraische Kurven und Funktionen. 1925.
Vorlesungen über allgemeine Mechanik. 1928.
Vorlesungen zur Einführung in die Mechanik raumerfüllender Massen. 1909.
Graphische Darstellungen aus der reinen und angewandten Mathematik. 1894.
with Max Noether: Über algebraische Funktionen und ihre Anwendung in der Geometrie. Mitt. Göttinger Akad.1873, and their article with the same name in the Mathematischen Annalen Bd.7, 1874, Online
with Max Noether: Die Entwicklung der Theorie der algebraischen Funktionen in älterer und neuerer Zeit. Jahresbericht DMV 1894.
 Das Relativitätsprinzip. Teubner 1912.
 Über Kepler's Astronomia nova. Stuttgart 1930. (15 pp.)

See also
Brill–Noether theory
Chasles–Cayley–Brill formula
Discriminant of an algebraic number field

References

External links
 

1842 births
1935 deaths
19th-century German mathematicians
20th-century German mathematicians
Academic staff of the Technical University of Munich
University of Giessen alumni
Academic staff of the University of Tübingen
Scientists from Darmstadt